Alberto José Poletti (born 20 July 1946) was an Argentine retired footballer who played as a goalkeeper. He was mainly known for being a part of the successful Estudiantes de La Plata team of 1967–1970.
He started his career with Estudiantes in 1965. His last match with them was on Dec 16, 1970 against Velez Sarsfield.
In the 1969 Intercontinental Cup, he received a life ban because of a fight. However, he was pardoned and was able to play again.

In 1971 he moved to Club Atlético Huracán for a season and then played for Olympiakos in Greece between 1972 and 1973, where due to health problems, he decided to retire from professional football.

Honours

   Argentine Primera División: 1967

   Copa Libertadores: 1968, 1969, 1970

   Intercontinental Cup: 1968

   Copa Interamericana: 1969

References

1946 births
Living people
Argentine footballers
Estudiantes de La Plata footballers
Association football goalkeepers